Habenaria hymenophylla, commonly known as the coastal rein orchid, is a species of orchid that is endemic to northern Australia. It up to eight leaves scattered along the stem and up to thirty smelly green and white flowers.

Description 
Habenaria hymenophylla is a tuberous, perennial herb with between six and eight leaves. The flowers have an unpleasant smell, especially in the late afternoon. The lateral sepals are a similar size to the dorsal sepal and spread apart from each other. Flowering occurs from October to April.

Taxonomy and naming
Habenaria hymenophylla was first formally described in 1911 by Rudolf Schlechter and the description was published in Repertorium specierum novarum regni vegetabilis.

Distribution and habitat
The coastal rein is found in northern parts of the Northern Territory where it is found near Darwin, in Arnhem Land and on Melville Island. It also occurs in disjunct populations in Queensland, including on the Cape York Peninsula and between Ingham and Rockhampton. It grows in rainforest, often near the coast and in woodland.

References

Orchids of the Northern Territory
Orchids of New Guinea
Endemic orchids of Australia
Plants described in 1911
hymenophylla